Ubuntu Hacks: Tips & Tools for Exploring, Using, and Tuning Linux is a book of tips about Ubuntu, a popular Linux distribution. The book was published by O'Reilly Media in June 2006 as part of the O'Reilly Hacks series.

Editions 
 First edition (2006; 447 pages)

External links 
O'Reilly Online catalog: Ubuntu Hacks
Slashdot review

2006 non-fiction books
O'Reilly Media books
Books about Linux